USS Secret (SP-1063) was a United States Navy patrol vessel in commission from 1917 to 1918.

Secret was built as a private motorboat of the same name in 1916 by William E. Haff at New Rochelle, New York. On 28 May 1917, the U.S. Navy leased her from her owner, John S. Baker of Short Hills, New Jersey, for use as a section patrol boat during World War I. She was commissioned the same day as USS Secret (SP-1063).

Assigned to the 5th Naval District, Secret served as a dispatch boat. She also served as a rescue boat at Naval Air Station Anacostia in Washington, D.C.

Secret was decommissioned on 30 December 1918 and was returned to Baker the same day.

See also
 Crash boats of World War 2

Notes

References 
 
 Department of the Navy Naval History and Heritage Command Online Library of Selected Images: U.S. Navy Ships: USS Secret (SP-1063), 1917-1918. Previously the civilian motor boat Secret.
 NavSource Online: Section Patrol Craft Photo Archive Secret (SP 1063)

External links
 

Patrol vessels of the United States Navy
World War I patrol vessels of the United States
Dispatch boats of the United States Navy
Ships built in New York (state)
1916 ships